Jesse Hamilton is an American lawyer and politician in New York City. A member of the Democratic Party, he represented the New York State Senate's 20th District, including parts of the Brooklyn neighborhoods of Crown Heights, Brownsville and East Flatbush from 2015 to 2018. Hamilton is a former member of the Independent Democratic Conference (IDC), a group of Democratic senators who allied themselves with Senate Republicans. Hamilton is the Secretary of the Brooklyn Democratic Party, the official organization of the Democratic Party for Brooklyn. He was defeated in the September 2018 Democratic primary election by lawyer Zellnor Myrie.

Early life
Hamilton was born and raised in the South Bronx. He later moved to Crown Heights, and served on the school board, as president of his block association and as president of the Rosa Parks Independent Democratic Club. He was the Democratic District Leader in the 43rd Assembly District for nearly a decade. He also served as counsel for then-Senator Eric Adams of District 20.

Career
In November 2013, Adams was elected to the office of Brooklyn Borough president, leaving District 20's State Senate seat vacant. On September 9, 2014, Hamilton won the Democratic Party primary election to represent District 20. There was no Republican Party opponent, Hamilton won the November 2014 general election without opposition.

On Monday, November 7, 2016, Hamilton announced that he would join the Independent Democratic Conference, a group of Democratic senators who caucused with the Senate Republican Conference, allowing the Republicans to control the chamber. In January 2017, after joining the IDC, Hamilton was named Chair of the Senate Standing Committee on Banking - which The New York Times notes earned him a $5,500 raise.

In 2017, Hamilton played a key role in passage of legislation to raise the age of juvenile jurisdiction for 16- and 17-year-olds, ensuring that they will not be treated as adults under the criminal justice system for misdemeanors and many felonies. The legislation also removes 16- and 17-year-olds from Rikers Island by April 1, 2018, to the extent practicable, and by no later than October 1, 2018. The IDC-backed legislation was criticized as a "watered down" version of legislation proposed by Democrats, and because "it still pushes the majority of juveniles through the criminal justice system.  "As of 2017, there were 150 minors in Rikers Island.

Hamilton has advocated for an end to broken windows policing and has proposed legislation to decriminalize fare evasion on subways, buses and railroads, which would make fare evasion a civil penalty instead of a criminal penalty.

In 2017, Hamilton and Assemblyman Felix Ortiz passed legislation named "Briana's Law", after 11-year-old Briana Ojeda, that requires New York City police officers and state troopers to be retrained in CPR every two years. The legislation was introduced after the death of Briana Ojeda when she suffered a severe asthma attack. A police officer stopped her mother driving the wrong way on a one-way street but the police officer did not know how to perform CPR to save Briana's life.

Hamilton and his IDC colleagues rejoined the Senate Democratic Conference in April 2018. Subsequently, the Republican conference stripped Hamilton of his position as Chair of the Banks Committee.

In the September 13, 2018 Democratic primary, Hamilton was defeated by lawyer Zellnor Myrie. Hamilton's loss was attributed to long-simmering anger with the former members of the IDC. Due to New York State's electoral fusion laws allowing candidates to run on multiple ballot lines in an election, Hamilton still appeared in the November 6, 2018, general election as the third-party candidate for the Independence Party of New York and the Women's Equality Party. Myrie won the general election.

In the 2020 elections, Hamilton ran against incumbent Diana Richardson in the Democratic primary for the New York Assembly's 43rd district. Hamilton lost to Richardson in a landslide.

References

External links
 Ballotpedia: Jesse Hamilton

Living people
New York (state) Democrats
People from Crown Heights, Brooklyn
People from the Bronx
21st-century American politicians
Politicians from Brooklyn
Independent Democratic Conference
1964 births